Yuba State Park is a state park on the Sevier Bridge Reservoir (also known as Yuba Reservoir) in Juab and Sanpete counties in central Utah, United States.

Description
Recreational opportunities include camping, boating, swimming, fishing, and nearby off highway vehicle riding.

History
Yuba State Park got its name from the individuals who built the dam. Local farmers and ranchers had to build the dam themselves or risk losing their water rights. The men working on the structure called it the U.B. Dam. As they worked they sang a song that stated they were damned if they worked and damned if they didn't. The phonetic sound of the reservoir's name was eventually spelled Yuba.

See also

 List of Utah State Parks

References

External links

 

State parks of Utah
Protected areas of Juab County, Utah
Protected areas of Sanpete County, Utah
Protected areas established in 1964